Dzigbordi Dosoo is a Ghanaian business woman, speaker and consultant who owns a talk show called The Dzigbordi Show which airs in 46 countries in Africa, the UK and Europe. She is the co-creator for an African skin and body care aromatherapy and spa line product called Kanshi. She is the founder and Chief Executive officer for Allure Africa, a brand she has successfully marketed in Ghana and beyond.

Early life and education 
Dosoo had her secondary level education at the Accra Girls Senior High School. She obtained a bachelor's degree in finance and accounting from Virginia State University, and attended Harvard University. She is also a certified Image, Etiquette and International Protocols Expert.

Career 
In 1998, after a ten-year career in finance, Dosoo began to establish her spa business in Ghana. She first started the Allure Saloon, which then became Allure Africa. She founded Business Linkages International, a financial services consultancy, which transitioned into the Eagle Group in 2004. She owns an aromatherapy and body-care brand called Kanshi which was featured in Women's Wear Daily in 2010 before entering the United States market in 2014.

Personal life 
She was the wife of the late  Lionel Van Lare Dosoo, a  former Deputy Governor of the Bank of Ghana. She is the mother of one child.

Awards 
 2009 "Marketing Woman of the Year" by the Chartered Institute of Marketing, Ghana (CIMG)
 2017 "Inspiration Award – Heart of Beauty and Innovation", and "Repêchage President’s Award", Repechage Annual Conference in New York City
2019 Nominated for Women's Choice Awards Africa, "The Boss Lady of the Year" category

References

Living people
21st-century Ghanaian businesswomen
21st-century Ghanaian businesspeople
Virginia State University alumni
Accra Girls Senior High School alumni
Year of birth missing (living people)